The Sharjah Art Museum is an art museum in the city of Sharjah, United Arab Emirates. It was housed in Bait Al Serkal in Al Shuwaihean Area. It is one of the leading art institutions in the Persian Gulf region.

A new building of the museum was established on April 7, 1997, under the patronage of Sheikh Sultan bin Muhammad Al-Qasimi, the Supreme Council Member and Ruler of Sharjah during the 3rd Sharjah International Arts Biennial. Sharjah Art Museum has a collection of modern and contemporary art by artists from United Arab Emirates and other Middle Eastern countries. It also organizes and hosts temporary exhibitions and educational events. It has a total floor area of 111,000 m2 with galleries over two floors and an underground car park beneath it. The museum celebrated 25 years in April 2022 since opening for public to promoting art and fostering creativity in the UAE.

Exhibitions 

Sharjah Art Museum since its establishment, held numerous temporary exhibitions throughout the years. They were curated by the museum or in collaboration with other institutions. Some of those institutions were Cobra Museum of Modern Art in Amsterdam, TATE Britain in London, Barjeel Art Foundation in the UAE, and The Gibran Museum in Lebanon.

Temporary Exhibition
 Andreas Gursky, 2007
 Face of Asia: Steve McCurry Photographs, 2008
 Lure of the East, 2009
 Tarek Al-Ghoussein, 2010
 Lithographs of David Roberts, 2011
 Ibrahim El-Salahi: A Visionary Modernist, 2012
 Trajectories: 19th and 21st Century Printmaking from India and Pakistan, 2014
 Cobra: 1000 Days of Free Art, 2015
 Drawings of Gibran: A Human Perspective, 2015
 Considering Dynamics and Forms of Chaos: Angela Bullock and Maria Zeres, 2016
 Kamal Youssef: Egyptian Surrealism's Time Capsule, 2016
 Ahmed Morsi: A Dialogic Imagination Exhibition, 2017
 Subversive Forms of Social Sculpture: Abdulnasser Gharem and Heimo Zobernig, 2018
 A Century in Flux: Highlights from the Barjeel Art Foundation, 2018-2023

Annual Exhibitions
Emirates Fine Arts Society Exhibition
Lasting Impressions Exhibition organized by the museum to highlight pioneer Arab artists in the MENA Region some of them include:
 Thuraya Albaqsami 
 Abdulqader Al Rais
 Ismail Al Rifai 
 Abdul Latif Al Smoudi
 George Bahgory
 Najat Maky
 Ismail Shammout and Tamam El Akhal
Sharjah Biennial, organized by Sharjah Art Foundation
Sharjah Islamic Art Festival

See also 

 Sharjah Museums Authority

References

External links 

 

Museums in Sharjah (city)
Arab art scene
Art museums and galleries in the United Arab Emirates
Museums established in 1997
1997 establishments in the United Arab Emirates